Wong Chuk Hang is an elevated MTR rapid transit station in Hong Kong on the eastern section of the , built on the Staunton Creek Nullah and off the old site of Wong Chuk Hang Estate in Staunton Creek (Chung Mei). It is named after the locality of the same name further east and serves residents in that area, as well as connect to a public transport interchange on a widened section of Heung Yip Road. A network of footbridges serves future commercial and residential areas, and the station exists as a hub to the Shum Wan area as a whole. The station opened on 28 December 2016 with the rest of the South Island line. The South Island line depot is located to the south.

History
Wong Chuk Hang station was opened on 28 December 2016.

Station layout

This elevated station has two tracks and an island platform. Commissioned by the MTR Corporation, Aedas, as part of the engineering team led by Atkins, were the architect for the station.

The station artwork, Huddle by Chao Harn-kae, resembles birds flying.

Entrances/exits
A footbridge connection to various areas of Shum Wan is provided. An exit also connects the station to the planned Wong Chuk Hang Station Public Transport Interchange, for passengers to connect to other modes of public transport.

Wong Chuk Hang station has three entrances/exits. Exit B is subdivided into 3 exits and entrances. The footbridge across Wong Chuk Hang Road and Heung Yip Road, connecting the B-prefixed exits, opened on 3 April 2016.

 A1/A2: Public transport interchange in median of Heung Yip Road  (1 lift)
 B: Nam Long Shan Road, Wong Chuk Hang Road, Aberdeen, Wong Chuk Hang industrial area, Yip Kan Street, Yip Hing Street (via footbridge)  (3 lifts)

Wong Chuk Hang Depot
While the main station will take up the northern part of the former Wong Chuk Hang Estate site, an underground depot is located to the south. This depot services and maintains South Island line trains. The depot is completely sealed and is situated on sunken ground to avoid noise pollution to areas nearby.

Atop the depot, a residential estate will be developed by the MTR Corporation. It will comprise 14 blocks with about 4,700 flats, as well as a commercial element.

Future
Wong Chuk Hang station is proposed to be an interchange station between the eastern and western sections of the South Island line. The platforms of the  will be built over those of the South Island line.

References

MTR stations on Hong Kong Island
South Island line
South Island line (West)
Wong Chuk Hang